Barsar Assembly constituency is one of the 68 constituencies in the Himachal Pradesh Legislative Assembly of Himachal Pradesh a northern state of India. Barsar is also part of Hamirpur, Himachal Pradesh Lok Sabha constituency.

Member of Legislative Assembly

Before Delimitation Barsar Assembly Is known as Nadaunta Assembly

Election candidates

2022

Election results

2017

See also
 Barsar
 Hamirpur district, Himachal Pradesh
 List of constituencies of Himachal Pradesh Legislative Assembly

References

External links
 

Assembly constituencies of Himachal Pradesh
Hamirpur district, Himachal Pradesh